The Zimbabwean cricket team toured Bangladesh in November 2015. In January 2016 the BCB confirmed a further four T20I matches to be played later the same month in Bangladesh as preparation for the Asia Cup and the World Twenty20.

November 2015
The November fixtures consisted of three One Day Internationals (ODIs), two Twenty20 Internationals (T20Is) and a tour match.

Originally, the tour was scheduled to comprise three Test matches, five ODIs and three T20Is, but the Bangladesh Cricket Board (BCB) reduced it to two Tests, three ODIs and three T20Is. This was because of Bangladesh's preparation for the Asia Cup tournament. The Tests were moved from their originally scheduled dates in January 2015 and were brought forward to November 2015. Zimbabwe were going to play the two Tests in Bangladesh, before returning in January 2016 to complete the limited-overs fixtures.

However, on 16 October 2015, the BCB announced that the Tests would be substituted for limited-overs matches. These would consist of four to five matches and be completed by 22 November, when the Bangladesh Premier League starts. The dates for the tour were confirmed by the BCB on 21 October 2015.

Bangladesh won the ODI series 3–0 and the T20I series was drawn 1–1.

November squads

Bangladesh's Soumya Sarkar was ruled out of the ODI series because of an injury. He was replaced by Imrul Kayes.

November tour match

Bangladesh Cricket Board XI v Zimbabweans

November ODI series

1st ODI

2nd ODI

3rd ODI

November T20I series

1st T20I

2nd T20I

January 2016

In January 2016 four more T20I matches were announced by the BCB, all to be played at the Sheikh Abu Naser Stadium, Khulna. The series was drawn 2–2. The series was named the Walton T20 Cricket Series. Zimbabwe's Hamilton Masakadza set a world record for the most runs scored in a T20I bilateral series, with a total of 222 across the four games. Following the conclusion of the series, Elton Chigumbura stepped down as captain of the Zimbabwe team.

January 2016 squads

Following the conclusion of the 2nd T20I, Mosaddek Hossain, Mohammad Shahid and Muktar Ali were added to Bangladesh's squad. Mushfiqur Rahim was ruled out of the series after getting a hamstring injury during the first T20I and was replaced by Taskin Ahmed.

January T20I series

1st T20I

2nd T20I

3rd T20I

4th T20I

References

External links
 Series home (Nov 2015) at ESPNCricinfo
 Series home (Jan 2016) at ESPNCricinfo

2015 in Zimbabwean cricket
2016 in Zimbabwean cricket
2015 in Bangladeshi cricket
2016 in Bangladeshi cricket
International cricket competitions in 2015–16
Zimbabwean cricket tours of Bangladesh